Josslyn Francis Pennington, 5th Baron Muncaster,  (25 December 1834 – 30 March 1917) was a British soldier and Conservative Party politician.

Biography
Muncaster was the third son of Lowther Augustus John Pennington, 3rd Baron Muncaster, and his wife Frances Catherine, daughter of Sir John Ramsden, 4th Baronet. On 21 January 1853, he purchased an ensigncy in the 90th Regiment of Foot. He was a captain in the Rifle Brigade and fought in the Crimean War. He was appointed a deputy lieutenant of the East Riding of Yorkshire on 1 November 1860, and 8 August 1868 he raised the 11th (Pocklington) Yorkshire (East Riding) Rifle Volunteer Corps.

In 1862 he succeeded his elder brother in the barony. As this was an Irish peerage it did not entitle him to an automatic seat in the House of Lords. Muncaster was instead elected to the House of Commons for Cumberland West in 1872, a seat he held until 1880, and later represented Egremont from 1885 to 1892. He was also a Deputy Lieutenant and Justice of the Peace for Cumberland and served as Lord-Lieutenant of Cumberland between 1876 and 1917. In 1898 he was created Baron Muncaster, of Muncaster in the County of Cumberland, in the Peerage of the United Kingdom, which gave him a seat in the House of Lords.

In 1870, he, his wife, and the rest of their travelling party were captured by bandits near Oropos. Lord and Lady Muncaster were freed to carry the demand for ransom; the Greek government sent troops to assault the bandits, who killed the other hostages before being overwhelmed.

On 22 November 1871, he was appointed a deputy lieutenant of Cumberland.

Part of his estate at Gillbrow near Lindal was leased to Harrison Ainslie by the 4th Baronet.  The remainder of the ore bearing ground was leased to Parkside Mining Company in 1878.

Lord Muncaster died in March 1917, aged 82, and all his titles became extinct.

Family
Lord Muncaster married Constance (b. 1839), daughter of Edmund L'Estrange, in 1863. They had no children.  Lady Muncaster survived her husband by only four months and died in July 1917.

Legacy
St James' Church, Warter was built for Muncaster in 1862–1863.

Notes

References

External links 
 

1834 births
1917 deaths
Barons in the Peerage of Ireland
Muncaster, Josslyn Pennington, 1st Baron
Rifle Brigade officers
British Army personnel of the Crimean War
Lord-Lieutenants of Cumberland
Conservative Party (UK) MPs for English constituencies
English justices of the peace
UK MPs 1868–1874
UK MPs 1874–1880
UK MPs 1885–1886
UK MPs 1886–1892
UK MPs who inherited peerages
UK MPs who were granted peerages
Directors of the Furness Railway
Deputy Lieutenants of the East Riding of Yorkshire
Cameronians officers
Deputy Lieutenants of Cumberland
Peers of the United Kingdom created by Queen Victoria